The 2006–07 Algerian Cup was the 43rd edition of the Algerian Cup. MC Alger won the Cup by defeating city rivals USM Alger 1-0 in the final with a goal from midfielder Fodil Hadjadj. It was MC Alger's sixth Algerian Cup and their second in a row.

Round of 16

Quarter-finals

Semi-finals

Final
Kickoff times are in local time.

Champions

External links
 Coupe d'Algérie 2007
 2006/07 Coupe Nationale

Algerian Cup
Algerian Cup
Algerian Cup